Manuela del Carmen Obrador Narváez (born 12 June 1971) is a Mexican politician who has been the member of the Chamber of Deputies for the First Federal Electoral District of Chiapas since 2018. She is a member of the National Regeneration Movement. She was re-elected at the 2021 election.

Personal life 
She is the first cousin of President Andrés Manuel López Obrador.

References 
Living people
1971 births
21st-century Mexican women politicians
Politicians from Chiapas
Morena (political party) politicians
Deputies of the LXIV Legislature of Mexico
Deputies of the LXV Legislature of Mexico
Women members of the Chamber of Deputies (Mexico)
Members of the Chamber of Deputies (Mexico) for Chiapas